FHT may refer to:

 Fast Hartley transform
 Feminizing hormone therapy
 Fetal heart tones
 First-hitting-time model
 Female hose thread, for the female garden hose thread